Dany Lademacher (born Daniël Germain Jean Lademacher, also Danny; 17 June 1950) is a Belgian guitar player.

Born in Etterbeek, he played in a number of Belgian bands before joining prominent Dutch band Herman Brood and his Wild Romance. He was also a studio and live guitarist for a variety of artists, including T.U.S.H., Gerritsen & Van Dijk and I Travel.

Kleptomania
Founded in 1968 by Charlie Deraedemaeker (bass), Francis Goya (guitar) and singer Lou Deprijck, Kleptomania was a cult Belgian rock band which underwent several line up changes, Lademacher joining in 1969 and being voted best guitarist in Belgium three years running. Kleptomania's debut single Kept Woman sounded somewhat similar to Black Sabbath, Kleptomania's popularity peaked in summer 1970 when the band opened for The Wallace Collection at Puzzle P Festival in Brussels, and shared the bill with Badfinger at the Bilzen Rock & Jazz Festival.

Herman Brood and his Wild Romance

Lademacher recounted in his autobiographical Wild Romance--Een fijne hel how he, a young man from Brussels, fell into Brood's rock and roll lifestyle, complete with sex and drugs. Writing songs initially came easily, with Brood writing lyrics and Lademacher the music. But by 1981 he had had enough; he said that Brood's liquor and drugs habit (Brood switched from speed to heroin) made working with him impossible. For six years he played with the bands Innersleeve and Vitesse.

In 1981, he won an Edison award for his album Dany Lademachers Innersleeve. In 1987 Brood asked him to return, which he did. They recorded three albums (including Yada Yada), but by 1989 Brood, lacking commercial success, stopped performing.

The Radios
After his second parting with Herman Brood Lademacher joined the Belgian pop band The Radios which had several hit-singles in the Netherlands and Belgium.

References

Living people
1950 births
Belgian male guitarists
People from Etterbeek